Pan-African Paediatric Surgical Association (PAPSA) is an organisation established in 1994 to promote the practice of paediatric surgery in Africa, improvement of research, interchange of ideas and sharing of knowledge and expertise for the benefit of the children of Africa.

, there have been 15 annual Paediatric Surgical Conferences under PAPSA.

Prof. Alp Numanoglu is the President of PAPSA and Dr Adesoji O. Ademuyiwa is the general secretary.

History
During the 38th British Association of Paediatric Surgeons (BAPS) conference in Budapest in 1991, the concept of an Association representing Africa was proposed with 9 paediatric surgeons from Africa who attended the meeting. 

As the idea needed international recognition and support, the World Federation of Associations of Pediatric Surgeons (WOFAPS) gave  support during the development phases of the as yet to be established Association.

PAPSA Conferences
1st PAPSA conference: 1994: Nairobi, Kenya
2nd PAPSA Conference: 1996: Cairo, Egypt
3rd PAPSA Conference: 1998: Cape Town, South Africa
4th PAPSA Conference: 2001: Abidjan, Cote d'Ivoire
5th PAPSA Conference: 2002: Cairo, Egypt
6th PAPSA Conference: 2004: Lake Malawi
7th PAPSA Conference 2005: Alexandria, Egypt
8th PAPSA Conference: 2006: Mombasa, Kenya
9th PAPSA Conference: 2008: Accra, Ghana
10th PAPSA Conference: 2010: Dar Es Salam, Tanzania
11th PAPSA Conference: 2012: Cape Town, South Africa
12th PAPSA Conference: 2014: Cairo, Egypt
13th PAPSA Conference: 2016: Lagos, Nigeria
14th PAPASA Conference: 2018: Addis Ababa, Ethiopia
15th PAPSA Conference: 2020: Virtual

References

External links

See also
 American Pediatric Surgical Association (APSA)
 British Association of Paediatric Surgeons (BAPS)
 World Federation of Associations of Pediatric Surgeons (WOFAPS)

External links
  German Association of Paediatric Surgeons (DKH)

Surgical organizations
Medical associations based in Africa
Medical associations
Organizations established in 1994
Pediatric surgery
Pediatric organizations